Pretty Clothes is a 1927 American silent drama film, directed by Phil Rosen. It stars Jobyna Ralston, Gertrude Astor, and Johnny Walker, and was released on October 15, 1927.

Cast list
Jobyna Ralston as Marion Dunbar
Gertrude Astor as Rose Dunbar
Johnny Walker as Russell Thorpe
Lloyd Whitlock as Philip Bennett
Charles Clary as Thorpe, Sr.
Jack Mower as Albert Moore
Lydia Knott as Mrs. Dunbar

See also
Gertrude Astor filmography

Preservation status
The film is preserved in the Library of Congress collection.

References

External links 
 
 
 
 

Films directed by Phil Rosen
1927 drama films
1927 films
Silent American drama films
American silent feature films
American black-and-white films
1920s English-language films
1920s American films